Military leadership in the American Civil War was vested in both the political and the military structures of the belligerent powers. The overall military leadership of the United States during the Civil War was ultimately vested in the President of the United States as constitutional commander-in-chief, and in the political heads of the military departments he appointed. Most of the major Union wartime commanders had, however, previous regular army experience. A smaller number of military leaders originated from the United States Volunteers. Some of them   derived from nations other than the United States.

In the Southern Confederacy, the constitutional commander-in-chief was educated at West Point and had served in the Mexican War. Many officers in the United States Army, most of them educated at West Point at the expense of the United States, and having taken an oath of allegiance to the same, joined the rebellion against it. Several significant Confederate military leaders emerged from state unit commands. Some military leaders derived from countries other than the United States.

The United States (The Union)

Civilian military leaders

President Abraham Lincoln was Commander-in-Chief of the Union armed forces throughout the conflict; after his April 14, 1865 assassination, Vice President Andrew Johnson became the nation's chief executive. Lincoln's first Secretary of War was Simon Cameron; Edwin M. Stanton was confirmed to replace Cameron in January 1862. Thomas A. Scott was Assistant Secretary of War. Gideon Welles was Secretary of the Navy, aided by Assistant Secretary of the Navy Gustavus Fox.

Regular Army officers
When the war began, the American standing army or "Regular army" consisted of only 1080 commissioned officers and 15,000 enlisted men. Although 142 regular officers became Union generals during the war, most remained "frozen" in their regular units. That stated, most of the major Union wartime commanders had previous regular army experience.  Over the course of the war, the Commanding General of the United States Army was, in order of service, Winfield Scott, George B. McClellan, Henry Halleck, and finally, Ulysses S. Grant.

Commanding Generals, U.S.A.

Robert Anderson
Don Carlos Buell
John Buford
Ambrose Burnside
Edward Canby
Philip St. George Cooke
Darius N. Couch
Thomas Turpin Crittenden
Thomas Leonidas Crittenden
Samuel Curtis
Abner Doubleday
William B. Franklin
James A. Garfield
Quincy Adams Gillmore
Gordon Granger
Ulysses S. Grant
David McMurtrie Gregg
Henry Wager Halleck
Winfield Scott Hancock
William B. Hazen
Samuel P. Heintzelman
Joseph Hooker
Oliver O. Howard
Andrew A. Humphreys
Henry Jackson Hunt
David Hunter
Philip Kearny
Erasmus D. Keyes
John McArthur
George B. McClellan
Alexander McDowell McCook
Irvin McDowell
James B. McPherson
Joseph K. Mansfield
George Meade
Montgomery C. Meigs
Wesley Merritt
Dixon S. Miles
Edward Ord
Alfred Pleasonton
John Pope
John F. Reynolds
William Rosecrans
John Schofield
Winfield Scott
John Sedgwick
Philip Sheridan
William T. Sherman
Henry W. Slocum
Andrew Jackson Smith
William Farrar Smith
George Stoneman
Edwin V. Sumner
George Sykes
George Henry Thomas
Alfred Thomas Archimedes Torbert
Gouverneur K. Warren
James H. Wilson
John E. Wool

Militia and political leaders appointed to Union military leadership
Under the United States Constitution, each state recruited, trained,  equipped, and maintained local militia; regimental officers were appointed and promoted by state governors. After states answered Lincoln's April 15, 1861, ninety-day call for 75,000 volunteer soldiers, most Union states' regiments and batteries became known as United States Volunteers to distinguish between state-raiused forces and regular army units. Union brigade-level officers (generals) could receive two different types of Federal commissions: U.S. Army or U.S. Volunteers (ex: Major General, U.S.A. as opposed to Major General, U.S.V.). While most Civil War generals held volunteer or brevet rank, many generals held both types of commission; regular rank was considered superior.

Edward D. Baker
Nathaniel Prentice Banks
Francis Preston Blair, Jr.
Benjamin Franklin Butler
Joshua Lawrence Chamberlain
Jacob Dolson Cox
John Adams Dix
John C. Frémont
Nathan Kimball
John A. Logan
John Alexander McClernand
Daniel Sickles
James B. Steedman
Alfred Terry
Lew Wallace

Native American and international officers in Union Army
Reflecting the multi-national makeup of the soldiers engaged, some Union military leaders derived from nations other than the United States.

Philippe, Comte de Paris
Michael Corcoran
Włodzimierz Krzyżanowski
Thomas Francis Meagher
Ely Parker
Albin F. Schoepf
Carl Schurz
Franz Sigel
Régis de Trobriand
Ivan Turchaninov

Union naval leaders
The rapid rise of the United States Navy during the Civil War contributed enormously to the North's ability to effectively blockade ports and Confederate shipping from quite early in the conflict. Handicapped by an aging 90 ship fleet, and despite significant manpower losses to the Confederate Navy after secession, a massive ship construction campaign embracing technological innovations from civil engineer James Buchanan Eads and naval engineers like Benjamin F. Isherwood and John Ericsson, along with four years' daily experience with modern naval conflict put the U. S. Navy onto a path which has led to today's world naval dominance.

Commanding Officer, U.S.N.

John A. Dahlgren
Charles Henry Davis
Samuel Francis du Pont
David Farragut
Andrew Hull Foote
Samuel Phillips Lee
David Dixon Porter
John Ancrum Winslow
John Lorimer Worden

The Confederate States

Civilian military leaders
Jefferson Davis was named provisional president on February 9, 1861, and assumed similar commander-in-chief responsibilities as would Lincoln; on November 6, 1861, Davis was elected President of the Confederate States of America under the Confederate Constitution. Alexander H. Stephens was appointed as Vice President of the Confederate States of America on February 18, 1861, and later assumed identical vice presidential responsibilities as Hannibal Hamlin did. Several men served the Confederacy as Secretary of War, including Leroy Pope Walker, Judah P. Benjamin, George W. Randolph, James Seddon, and John C. Breckinridge. Stephen Mallory was Confederate Secretary of the Navy throughout the conflict.

Former Regular Army officers
In the wake of secession, many regular officers felt they could not betray loyalty to their home state, and as a result some 313 of those officers resigned their commission and in many cases took up arms for the Confederate Army. Himself a graduate of West Point and a former regular officer, Confederate President Jefferson Davis highly prized these valuable recruits to the cause and saw that former regular officers were given positions of authority and responsibility.

Richard H. Anderson
P.G.T. Beauregard
Milledge Luke Bonham
Braxton Bragg
Simon Bolivar Buckner, Sr.
George B. Crittenden
Samuel Cooper
Jubal Anderson Early
Richard S. Ewell
Franklin Gardner
Robert S. Garnett
Josiah Gorgas
William Joseph Hardee
Ambrose Powell Hill
Daniel Harvey Hill
John Bell Hood
Thomas J. "Stonewall" Jackson
Albert Sidney Johnston
Joseph E. Johnston
Robert E. Lee
Stephen D. Lee
Mansfield Lovell
James Longstreet
John B. Magruder
Humphrey Marshall
Dabney Herndon Maury
John Hunt Morgan
John C. Pemberton
George Pickett
Edmund Kirby Smith
Gustavus Woodson Smith
J.E.B. Stuart
William B. Taliaferro
Earl Van Dorn
Joseph Wheeler
Henry A. Wise

Militia and political leaders appointed to Confederate military leadership
The land of Davy Crockett and Andrew Jackson, the state military tradition was especially strong in southern states, some of which were until recently frontier areas. Several significant Confederate military leaders emerged from state unit commands.

John C. Breckinridge
Benjamin F. Cheatham
Nathan Bedford Forrest
Wade Hampton
James L. Kemper
Ben McCulloch
Leonidas Polk
Sterling Price
Alexander P. Stewart
Richard Taylor

Native American and international officers in Confederate army
While no foreign power sent troops or commanders directly to assist the Confederate States, some leaders derived from countries other than the United States.

Patrick Cleburne
Stand Watie
Camille Armand Jules Marie, Prince de Polignac
Raleigh E. Colston
Collett Leventhorpe
George St. Leger Grenfell

Confederate naval leaders
The Confederate Navy possessed no extensive shipbuilding facilities; instead, it relied on refitting captured ships or purchased warships from Great Britain. The South had abundant navigable inland waterways, but after the Union built a vast fleet of gunboats, they soon dominated the Mississippi, Tennessee, Cumberland, Red and other rivers, rendering those waterways almost useless to the Confederacy.  Confederates did seize several Union Navy vessels in harbor after secession and converted a few into ironclads, like the CSS Virginia. Blockade runners were built and operated by British naval interests, although by late in the war the C.S. Navy operated some. A few new vessels were built or purchased in Britain, notably the CSS Shenandoah and the CSS Alabama. These warships acted as raiders, wreaking havoc with commercial shipping. Aggrieved by these losses, in 1871 the U.S. government was awarded damages from Great Britain in the Alabama Claims.

John Mercer Brooke
Isaac Newton Brown
Franklin Buchanan
James Dunwoody Bulloch
Catesby ap Roger Jones
Matthew Fontaine Maury
Raphael Semmes
Josiah Tattnall III
James Iredell Waddell

See also
History of Confederate States Army Generals
Confederate States Armed Forces
Union Army
Union Navy

Notes

References
 Boatner, Mark Mayo, III. The Civil War Dictionary. New York: McKay, 1959; revised 1988. .
 Eicher, John and David Eicher, Civil War High Commands, Stanford University Press, 2001, 
 Warner, Ezra J., Generals in Blue: Lives of the Union Commanders, Louisiana State University Press, 1964, 
 Warner, Ezra J., Generals in Gray: Lives of the Confederate Commanders, Louisiana State University Press, 1959, 
 Waugh, John C., The Class of 1846, From West Point to Appomattox: Stonewall Jackson, George McClellan and their Brothers, New York: Warner, 1994.

Further reading
American National Biography (20 vol. 2000; online and paper copies at academic libraries) short biographies by specialists
 Bledsoe, Andrew S. Citizen-Officers: The Union and Confederate Volunteer Junior Officer Corps in the American Civil War. Baton Rouge, Louisiana: Louisiana State University Press, 2015. .
 Current, Richard N.,  et al. eds. Encyclopedia of the Confederacy (1993) (4 Volume set; also 1 vol abridged version)
Dictionary of American Biography 30 vol, 1934–1990; short biographies by specialists
 Faust, Patricia L. (ed.) Historical Times Illustrated Encyclopedia of the Civil War (1986) 2000 short entries
 Heidler, David Stephen. Encyclopedia of the American Civil War: A Political, Social, and Military History (2002), 1600 entries in 2700 pages in 5 vol or 1-vol editions
 Woodworth, Steven E. ed. American Civil War: A Handbook of Literature and Research (1996), 750 pages of historiography and bibliography

Military history of the American Civil War

Military leadership